One or two supratrochlear lymph nodes are placed above the medial epicondyle of the humerus, medial to the basilic vein.

Their afferents drain the middle, ring, and little fingers, the medial portion of the hand, and the superficial area over the ulnar side of the forearm; these vessels are, however, in free communication with the other lymphatic vessels of the forearm. 

Their efferents accompany the basilic vein and join the deeper vessels.

They are distinguished in Terminologia anatomica from the "epitrochlear" (or "cubital") lymph nodes,  but the region is similar.

Clinical significance 
The supratrochlear lymph nodes swell up when an infection is detected in the hand or forearm areas. They may be palpable.

Additional images

See also
 Trochlea of humerus

References

External links
 
 

Lymphatics of the upper limb